Patrick Joseph Foye (born January 31, 1957) is an American lawyer who served as Chairman and CEO of the New York Metropolitan Transportation Authority (MTA). Prior to this role, he served as President of the MTA and Executive Director of the Port Authority of New York and New Jersey.

Life and career 
Foye graduated cum laude from Fordham University and attended Fordham Law School, where he also served as associate editor for the Fordham Law Review.  As a lawyer, he worked with Skadden Arps. He was appointed by Governor Eliot Spitzer to be chairman of New York's Empire State Development Corporation and was a board member of the Metropolitan Transportation Authority. Foye was Deputy County Executive for Economic Development under Nassau County Executive Ed Mangano.

In October 2011, Governor Andrew Cuomo appointed Foye to the post of Executive Director of the Port Authority. Cuomo ousted Christopher O. Ward who was a David Paterson appointee. In November 2015, Foye announced would leave the position in March 2016. In March 2016, Foye announced he would delay his departure from the position until June 2016, as no replacement had yet been named. Foye later decided to remain in his post as executive director. On August 14, 2017, Foye was succeeded by Rick Cotton as Executive Director of the Port Authority of New York and New Jersey.

In 2017, Foye became President of the Metropolitan Transportation Authority (MTA). On April 1, 2019, Foye was appointed Chairman and CEO of the MTA by Governor Cuomo with approval from the New York State Senate. In late July 2021, Pat Foye stepped down at the behest of Governor Cuomo to be replaced by Janno Lieber. In September 2021, after Andrew Cuomo stepped down, Foye announced he would not become the CEO of Empire State Development, and allow Kathy Hochul to nominate her own choice.

Fort Lee lane closure scandal 

Foye played a key role in ending an allegedly politically motivated traffic blockage that caused gridlock in Fort Lee, New Jersey for four days in 2013. On Monday, September 9 two of three toll lanes leading to the George Washington Bridge from Fort Lee local streets were closed during morning rush hour. Local officials, emergency services, and the public were not notified of the lane closures, which Fort Lee declared a threat to public safety. The resulting back-ups on local streets finally ended on Friday morning, September 13 when Foye ordered the two lanes reopened immediately. He said that the "hasty and ill-informed decision" to close lanes could have endangered lives and violated federal and state laws.

References 

Living people
Port Authority of New York and New Jersey people
Executives of Metropolitan Transportation Authority (New York)
1957 births
Skadden, Arps, Slate, Meagher & Flom people